The Taurus Model 731 is a stainless steel, double-action, six-shot, snubnosed revolver chambered in .32 H&R Magnum.  The revolver has rubber grips and features an integral keylock.

See also
 Taurus Model 605

References

 
 

Taurus revolvers
.32 S&W Long firearms